On Sunday, 11 July 1943, OUN-UPA death squads, aided by local Ukrainian peasants, simultaneously attacked at least 99 Polish settlements within Wołyń Province of the German-occupied prewar Second Polish Republic.  It was a well-orchestrated attack on people gathered at Catholic churches for Sunday mass. The towns affected included Kisielin (the Kisielin massacre), Poryck (the Poryck Massacre), Chrynów (the Chrynów massacre), Zabłoćce, and Krymn, while dozens of other towns were attacked on other dates; tens of churches and chapels were burned to the ground. 

The Volhynian massacres spread over four prewar provinces, including Wołyń with 40,000–60,000 victims, as well as Lwów, Stanisławów and Tarnopol provinces in Lesser Poland with 30,000-40,000 Poles murdered, for a total of 100,000 Polish victims of the UPA terror. 

The 11 July 1943 Bloody Sunday is not to be confused with the Stanisławów Ghetto Bloody Sunday massacre of 10,000 to 12,000 Polish Jews on 12 October 1941, before the Stanisławów Ghetto announcement .

Selected locations of the Volhynian Bloody Sunday massacres
Below is the list of selected locations of the OUN-UPA mass killing raids targeting Polish Catholics, with the confirmed number of victims from July 11, 1943 exceeding one dozen men, women and children, according to compendium of Massacres of Poles in Volhynia and Eastern Galicia compiled by Władysław Siemaszko and Ewa Siemaszko. Existing settlements which have been attacked, but whose number of Polish victims remained undetermined at the time when the information was collected, are not listed here.

References

Massacres of Poles in Volhynia